Giant Wild Goose Pagoda or Big Wild Goose Pagoda (literally "big swan goose pagoda"), is a monumental Buddhist pagoda located in southern Xi'an, Shaanxi, China. It was built in 648/649(?) during the Tang dynasty and originally had five stories. It was rebuilt in 704 during the reign of Empress Wu Zetian and its exterior brick facade was renovated during the Ming dynasty.

One of the pagoda's many functions was to hold sutras and figurines of Gautama Buddha that were brought to China from India by the seventh-century Buddhist monk, scholar, traveller, and translator Xuanzang. Today, the interior walls of the pagoda feature engraved statues of Buddha by the renowned 7th-century artist Yan Liben.

This pagoda was added to the World Heritage List, along with many other sites along the Silk Road, as part of the "Silk Roads: the Routes Network of Chang'an-Tianshan Corridor"  site in 2014.

Surroundings and history

The original pagoda was built during the reign of Emperor Gaozong of Tang (r. 649–683), then standing at a height of 60 m (198 ft). This construction of rammed earth with a stone exterior facade collapsed five decades later. The ruling Empress Wu Zetian had the pagoda rebuilt and added five new stories by the year 704.

A massive earthquake in 1556 heavily damaged the pagoda and reduced it by three stories, to its current height of seven stories.

The structure leans very perceptibly (several degrees) to the west. Its related structure, the 8th century Small Wild Goose Pagoda in Xi'an, only suffered minor damage in the 1556 earthquake (unrepaired to this day). The Giant Wild Goose Pagoda was extensively repaired during the Ming dynasty (1368–1644) and renovated again in 1964. The pagoda currently stands at a height of 64 m (210 ft) tall and from the top it offers views over the city of Xi'an.

The tower sits inside the Daci'en Temple complex ("mercy and kindness"). The Daci'en Temple was built in 648 to honor the Empress Zhangsun. The temple complex is open to the public and it receives millions of tourists each year. It can be accessed from the Da Yan Ta station of line 3 of the Xi'an Metro. One entrance is located at the northeast corner of the north plaza. A new entrance has opened during the end of 2017.

Gallery

See also
 List of tallest structures built before the 20th century

References

Benn, Charles (2002). China's Golden Age: Everyday Life in the Tang Dynasty. Oxford: Oxford University Press.
Ingles, O.G. "Impressions of a Civil Engineer in China," The Australian Journal of Chinese Affairs (Number 7, 1982): 141–150.
Heng Chye Kiang. (1999). Cities of Aristocrats and Bureaucrats: The Development of Medieval Chinese Cityscapes. Singapore: Singapore University Press. .
Watson, William. (2000). The Arts of China to A.D. 900. New Haven: Yale University Press. .

Buddhist temples in China
Buddhist temples in Shaanxi
Buddhist temples in Xi'an
Buildings and structures in Xi'an
Pagodas in China
Tang dynasty Buddhist temples
7th-century Buddhist temples
Towers completed in the 7th century
8th-century Buddhist temples
Major National Historical and Cultural Sites in Shaanxi
Wu Zetian
World Heritage Sites in China
Tourist attractions in Xi'an
Religious buildings and structures completed in 704
Religious buildings and structures completed in 652